Penicillium wellingtonense is a species of fungus in the genus Penicillium.

References

wellingtonense
Fungi described in 2011